Haydee Raquel Blandón Sandoval (born 10 May 1943), is a lawyer, activist and political leader who was the First Lady of Guatemala during the period of January 14, 1986, to January 14, 1991, as wife of the President of Guatemala Marco Vinicio Cerezo Arévalo. She was a candidate for Vice President of Guatemala in the 2011 elections for the Renewed Democratic Liberty party, led by Manuel Baldizón.

References

Living people
First ladies of Guatemala
People from Guatemala City
1943 births